, is a Japanese voice actor from Sendai, Miyagi Prefecture, Japan.

Filmography

Anime
Birdy the Mighty, Mori
Charlotte, Udō (ep 2)
Cybuster, Ken
Digimon Xros Wars, Stingmon
Dragon Ball Super, Zenō's Attendant, Anato, Katopesla
Eat-Man '98, soldier
Enzai, Guildias
Eyeshield 21, Masaru Honjo (ep 9)
Hareluya II Boy, Makoto Ichijou
Haunted Junction, Haruto Houjo
Hell Girl, Salaryman (ep 1)
Hikarian, Seven
Kaginado, Kengo Miyazawa
Magic User's Club, Akane's Boyfriend No.1; Akane's Boyfriend No.2
Mouse, Masatoshi Minami
Musou Orochi: Rebirth of the Demon Lord, Minamoto no Yoshitsune
One Piece, Gyaro, Izou
Ranma ½, Herb
Rave Master, Deep Snow, and L'Tiangle
Saint Seiya, Alraune Queen
Saint Seiya Omega, Dorado Spear
Shugo Chara!, Tsumugu Hinamori
Shugo Chara!! Doki-, Tsumugu Hinamori
Sorcerer Hunters, Sono Nii (ep 22)
The Law of Ueki, Kageo 'Kurokage' Kuroki
The Prince of Tennis, Kojiro Saeki
Vision of Escaflowne, Adjutant; Dalet; Soldier; Zaibach Soldier
World Trigger (2014), Tōru Narasaka
Xevious, Takeru

Video games
Zettai Fukuju Meirei, Kia
Ranma ½: Super Hard Battle, Herb
Enzai, Guildias
Fatal Frame III: The Tormented, Kei Amakura
Warriors Orochi 2, Yoshitsune Minamoto
Valkyrie Connect, Blade Crazed Welver, Druid Thiazi
Digimon Story: Cyber Sleuth: Dukemon
Digimon World: Next Order: Yukimura

Dubbing
''The New Woody Woodpecker Show - Woodrow Woodpecker

References

External links
 

 Yūsei Oda at GamePlaza-Haruka Voice Acting Database 

Japanese male voice actors
Komazawa University alumni
1969 births
Living people
Male voice actors from Sendai